Eoophyla cocos is a moth in the family Crambidae. It was described by Wolfram Mey in 2009. It is found in the Malaysian province of Sabah, on the island of Borneo.

References

Eoophyla
Moths described in 2009